Heather Moody (born August 21, 1973 in Rexburg, Idaho) is an American water polo player, who won a silver medal at the 2000 Summer Olympics. She was team captain of the US Women's National Team that captured the bronze medal at the 2004 Summer Olympics in Athens, and the only member of the team not from California. Her position is center forward.

Life 
Moody went to college at San Diego State University where she was a member of the Water Polo team.

In 1999 and 2001, Heather was United States Water Polo Player of the Year.

In June 2005, Bill Barnett resigned as coach of the U.S. women's water polo team because he couldn't come to terms on a contract. Heather Moody, serving as assistant coach, became interim head coach at the FINA World Championships in Montreal one month later. The rookie coach guided the United States to the championship game in women's water polo in July 2005, but lost to Hungary 10-7 in two overtimes. In September, Guy Baker replaced Heather Moody as head coach of the U.S. women's water polo team, leaving his positions as national team director and head coach of the U.S. men. Moody resumed the role of assistant coach.

In February 2007, Moody was inducted into the New York Athletic Club (NYAC) Hall of Fame with fellow Olympic medalists Natalie Golda and Nicolle Payne. The three women were members of the bronze medal 2004 U.S. Olympic team in Athens, and are the first women added to the NYAC Hall of Fame.

In March 2007, Heather Moody served as an assistant coach of the USA Women's National Water Polo Team, which defeated Australia to win the gold medal at the FINA Water Polo Championships.  In August 2008, Moody was still in her post as an assistant coach with the USA Women's National Water Polo Team when they were defeated in the gold medal match by the Netherlands at the Olympic Games in Beijing, China. In 2010, she was inducted into the USA Water Polo Hall of Fame.

She moved from Green River, Wyoming and now lives in Sacramento, California, where she coaches women's water polo at St. Francis High School in addition to her work with American River Water Polo Club.

See also
 United States women's Olympic water polo team records and statistics
 List of Olympic medalists in water polo (women)
 List of world champions in women's water polo
 List of World Aquatics Championships medalists in water polo

References

 Heather Moody's U.S. Olympic Team bio
 Heather Moody's U.S. Water Polo player biography
 Heather Moody's Golden West College coach bio
 USA Water Polo: Water Polo Olympic Medalists to be inducted into NYAC Hall of Fame.

External links
 

1973 births
American female water polo players
American water polo coaches
San Diego State Aztecs women's water polo players
California State University, Long Beach people
Water polo players at the 2000 Summer Olympics
Water polo players at the 2004 Summer Olympics
Living people
People from Rexburg, Idaho
Sportspeople from Idaho
Medalists at the 2004 Summer Olympics
World Aquatics Championships medalists in water polo
Medalists at the 2000 Summer Olympics
Olympic silver medalists for the United States in water polo
Olympic bronze medalists for the United States in water polo
People from Green River, Wyoming
People from Sacramento, California